Ctenacanthus (from  , 'comb' and  , 'spine') is an extinct genus of ctenacanthiform chondrichthyan. Remains have been found in the Bloyd Formation in Arkansas, United States (Carboniferous period) and in South America.

Valid species 
 Ctenacanthus buttersi St. John & Worthen, 1883
 Ctenacanthus chemungensis Claypole, 1885 
 Ctenacanthus concinnus Newberry, 1875
 Ctenacanthus denticulatus McCoy, 1848
 Ctenacanthus formosus Newberry, 1873 
 Ctenacanthus harrissi Caster, 1930 
 Ctenacanthus lamborni Wells, 1944 
 Ctenacanthus major Agassiz, 1843 
 Ctenacanthus pellensis St. John & Worthen, 1883 
 Ctenacanthus sculptus St. John & Worthen, 1875 
 Ctenacanthus terrelli Newberry, 1889
 Ctenacanthus tumidus Newberry, 1889
 Ctenacanthus vetustus Eastman, 1902
 Ctenacanthus wrightii Newberry, 1884
 Ctenacanthus amblyxiphias Cope, 1891

See also 
 List of prehistoric cartilaginous fish genera

References

External links 
 Fossil Sharks of the Rocky Mountains: Ctenacanthus and other Chondrichthyan Spines and Denticles. Wayne Itano, Boulder, Colorado, Karen Houck and Martin Lockley, University of Colorado, Denver

Prehistoric cartilaginous fish genera
Carboniferous sharks
Carboniferous animals of North America
Taxa named by Louis Agassiz